Stephen Charles Rodan  
MLC  (born 19 April 1954) is a Manx politician who served as the President of Tynwald from 2016 to 2021 and is a former Minister of the Isle of Man Government and former MHK for the constituency of Garff. He was first elected to the seat in a by-election in 1995.

He has been Isle of Man County Chairman of the Royal British Legion since 2012.

Early life and career
Born on 19 April 1954 in Glasgow to Robert W. Rodan and Betty Rodan (née Turner), he is a qualified pharmacist.

Rodan was educated at the High School of Glasgow and the University of Edinburgh, before graduating from Heriot-Watt University, Edinburgh, with a BSc (Hons) in pharmacy.

After graduating, in 1978, Rodan began practising as a pharmacist in Elgin, Morayshire. In 1980, he moved to Bermuda and worked as a pharmacy manager until moving to the Isle of Man.

Since 1987 Rodan has resided in Laxey, the most populated village in Garff, where he is the proprietor of a pharmacy. Politically he is a liberal, having chaired both the Heriot-Watt University Liberal Club and Scottish Young Liberals. He was also a Member of the National Executive of the Scottish Liberal Party. He stood for the House of Commons in 1979 in the constituency of Moray and Nairn, but was defeated by the Conservative Alexander Pollock.

Rodan was first elected as Member of the House of Keys for Garff in 1995, and re-elected in 1996, 2001, 2006, and 2011.

In 2006, Rodan, then Minister of Health and Social Security, was instrumental in enfranchising 16 and 17 year olds when he moved a successful amendment to Clause 3 of the Registration of Electors Bill, a piece of legislation intended to provide for the rolling registration of electors, resulting in the lowering of the voting age.

Rodan stood for Chief Minister of the Isle of Man following the November 2006 elections, but failed to gain the necessary support in round one. He then stood for Speaker and defeated David Cannan and Quintin Gill.

Rodan was elected as President of Tynwald on 19 June 2016 for a period of five years. Rodan presided over his final Tynwald Day on July 5, 2021, prior to standing down from the post. He was replaced as President of Tynwald by Laurence Skelly.

Rodan was appointed Officer of the Order of the British Empire (OBE) in the 2019 Birthday Honours for services to the Isle of Man.

Personal life
Rodan has been married to Ana (née Ballesteros Torres) since 1977; they have two children together.

Government positions

President of Tynwald, 2016–2021
Member of the House of Keys, 1995–2016
Minister of Education, 1999–2004
Minister of Health and Social Security, 2004–2006
Speaker of the House of Keys, 2006–2016
Deputy President of Tynwald, 2007-2016
Member of the Tynwald Standards and Members' Interests Committee, 2006–present
Member of the Tynwald Ceremony Arrangements Committee, 2006–present (Chairman (eo) 2016-present)
Chairman of the Standing Orders Committee of the Legislative Council, 2016–present
Member of the Tynwald Setting Enhancement Sub-Committee, 2006–present
Member of the Tynwald Standing Orders Committee, 2006–present
Member of the Tynwald Honours Committee, 2006–present
Member of the Tynwald Management Committee, 2006–present
Trustee of the Manx National Heritage, 2006–2012
Court of Liverpool University (eo), 2007-2014
Tynwald Representative on the British-Irish Parliamentary Assembly, 2007-2016
Chairman of the Estates and Housing Division, 1995-1996
Chairman of the Planning Committee, 1997-1999
Chairman of the Emoluments Committee (eo), 2006-2016
Chairman of the Tynwald Standards and Members' Interests Committee (eo), 2006-2016
Chairman of the Tynwald Management Committee (eo), 2006-2016
Chairman of the House of Keys Management and Members' Standards Committee (eo), 2006-2016
Chairman of the Standing Orders Committee of the House of Keys (eo), 2006-2016

Other posts 

 Royal Pharmaceutical Society of Great Britain, National Executive, 1978
 Scottish Liberal Party, 1975-1977
 Bermuda Pipe Band, 1980-1987
 Laxey Village Commissioners, 1991-1995 (Chairman 1993-1995)
 Laxey Traders' Association, Chairman 1990-1993
 UN Association (Isle of Man Branch), 2002–present
 Ellan Vannin Pipes and Drums, 2007–present
 Edinburgh University Liberal Club, Chairman 1974-1976
 Heriot-Watt University Liberal Club, Chairman 1976-1977
 Scottish Young Liberals, Chairman 1974-1976
 Cair Vie Manx Pipe Band, Chairman and Pipe Major 1992-1995
 Laxey and Lonan Heritage Trust, Chairman 1995–2014, Trustee and Director 1998-2014
 Laxey Fair Committee, Chairman 2009–present
 Caledonian Society of Bermuda, President 1983-1985
 Royal British Legion, Lonan and Laxey Branch President 1998–present, Isle of Man County President 2012–present
 Groudle Glen Railway, President 2015–present
 Manx Chemists' Association, Treasurer 1989-1995
 Great Laxey Mines Railway Ltd, Trustee and Director 2002-2014
 Laxey Working Men's Institute, Trustee and Director 1998-2005

Publications 

 Voting at 16 in the Isle of Man, The Parliamentarian Magazine, 2007/Issue 2
 Self-assessment in the Isle of Man, The Parliamentarian Magazine, 2012/Issue 1

References

Scottish chemists
Living people
1954 births
Members of the House of Keys 1991–1996
Members of the House of Keys 1996–2001
Members of the House of Keys 2001–2006
Members of the House of Keys 2006–2011
Members of the House of Keys 2011–2016
Politicians from Glasgow
Officers of the Order of the British Empire
Scottish pharmacists